The  is a monorail/people mover line operated by Skyrail Service. The line runs between Midoriguchi and Midori-Chūō, all within the new town called Skyrail Town Midorizaka, Aki, Hiroshima, Hiroshima, Japan. The line is officially called . The line is also known as the first Japanese public transport to introduce a smart card, simply called , from the time the line itself opened on August 28, 1998.

History
The line opened on 28 August 1998, with a total construction cost of approximately ¥6.2 billion.

The operators of the line announced on 5 November 2022 that the line would be closed by the end of 2023 due to profitability concerns, with it being replaced by electric buses.

Technology 
The line uses a new "Skyrail" rail transport system developed mainly by Kobe Steel and Mitsubishi Heavy Industries. It is a fusion between a suspended monorail and an aerial lift. Driverless gondola-sized cars, suspended from a single steel track, are moved by an attached cable. Inside each station, cars release the cable and move by linear motors. The technology allows the line to climb steep slopes of up to 14 degrees, while also being able to navigate curves of up to 30m radius.

Rolling stock 
The entire line uses 200 series vehicles, which hold up to 25 people. The operating speed is 15 km/h.

Services 
The line operates from around 630am to 10pm, with cars running every 15 minutes during the midday, and every 5-10 minutes at other times. A night taxi runs afterwards until midnight.

It takes five minutes to travel the whole length of the line. The fare is ¥170 for adults.

Stations
All the stations on the line are elevated, with two side platforms serving two tracks.

See also 
 List of railway lines in Japan
 Monorails in Japan
 People mover
 Automated guideway transit

References

External links 

  Intra-city transport system: Skyrail, from Kobe Steel official website.

Driverless suspended monorails
Monorails in Japan
1998 establishments in Japan